Pope John XXIII High School is the name of several high schools in the United States:

Saint John XXIII High School, formerly Pope John XXIII High School, Greater Katy, Harris County, Texas
Pope John XXIII Regional High School, Sparta, New Jersey
Pope John XXIII Central Catholic High School, Elgin, Nebraska
Pope John XXIII High School (Everett, Massachusetts)